Harry Richardson may refer to:

 Harry A. Richardson (1853–1928), American businessman and politician in Delaware
 Harold D. Richardson (1902–1993), one-time acting president of Arizona State University
 Harry Linley Richardson (1878–1947), New Zealand artist and stamp designer
 Harold Richardson (cricketer) (1873–?), English cricketer
 Harry Richardson (trade unionist) (1876-1936), English journalist and trade union leader
 Harry Van Buren Richardson, president of Gammon Theological Seminary and the Interdenominational Theological Center
 Harry Richardson (actor), Australian actor

See also
Henry Richardson (disambiguation)